ALPS may refer to:
A Language for Process Specification
Airport Logistics Park Singapore
Alps Electric, a multinational corporation based in Japan
Autoimmune lymphoproliferative syndrome
ALPS, Advanced Liquid Processing System developed by Toshiba for contaminated water
Application-Level Profile Semantics (ALPS) data format
Amphipathic lipid packing sensor motifs is a protein motif that senses membrane curvature.

See also
Alps (disambiguation)